Henry James Ten Eyck (July 25, 1856, Albany, N.Y. – November 29, 1887, Albany) was an American journalist. 

He graduated at Yale in 1879, third in a class of 131, and entered the office of the Albany Evening Journal, where he remained until his death. In October 1883, he became its managing editor, and in 1885 city editor. He was an occasional contributor to the magazines, more particularly the Century and the Popular Science Monthly, an article from his pen in the latter magazine in 1886 on "Some Tendencies in Taxation" having attracted much attention.

1856 births
1887 deaths
People from Albany, New York
Henry James
Yale University alumni